Bite-about is a very ruined pele tower or bastle house. It is situated in the parish of Eccles, between the villages of Fogo and Swinton to the south of Duns, Berwickshire, Scotland.

The building dates from the 16th century, and is still a property of the Trotter family. It received its unusual name during a besiegement by the English, whereby the inhabitants shared their rations a bite a time.

References

Houses completed in the 16th century
Towers completed in the 16th century
Peel towers in the Scottish Borders
Berwickshire
Ruined castles in the Scottish Borders